Red Clay State Historic Park is a state park located in southern Bradley County, Tennessee, United States. The park was the site of the last capital of the Cherokee Nation in the eastern United States from 1832 to 1838 before the enforcement of the Indian Removal Act of 1830. This resulted in a forced migration of most of the Cherokee people to present-day Oklahoma known as the Cherokee removal. The site is considered sacred to the Cherokees, and includes the Blue Hole Spring, a large hydrological spring. It is also listed as an interpretive center along the Trail of Tears National Historic Trail.

After the Cherokee removal, the site became private land, and was primarily used for agriculture. In the later part of the 20th century, a group of local historians undertook an effort to preserve and protect the site and turn it into a state park. The site was named to the National Register of Historic Places (NRHP) in 1972, and Red Clay State Park opened to the public in 1979. It encompasses  of land directly above the Tennessee—Georgia state line, and consists of a museum, replicas of Cherokee structures that once stood on the site, and three hiking trails, along with other amenities.

History

Cherokee history
Before the arrival of the first European settlers, the area was inhabited by the Cherokees, an Iroquoian-speaking people believed to have migrated south from the Great Lakes area, where other Iroquoian tribes arose. Their territory encompassed parts of present-day western North Carolina, western South Carolina, East Tennessee, northern Georgia, and northern Alabama. The Cherokee peoples in Tennessee were known by European settlers as Overhill Cherokee because they lived west of the Blue Ridge Mountains. In the late 18th and early 19th centuries, the Cherokees organized a national government modeled on the United States Constitution, and were recognized by European Americans as one of the Five Civilized Tribes. In anticipation of a forced removal of the Cherokees by the federal government, White settlers began rapidly moving into the area.

Between 1827 and 1831, Georgia legislators passed a series of laws that prohibited the Cherokees from holding public meetings and nullified all Cherokee laws within their borders. In 1830, the federal government passed the Indian Removal Act, which authorized then-President Andrew Jackson to negotiate removal treaties with Native American tribes in the Southeastern United States. As a result of these actions, the Cherokees began to vacate their capital of New Echota, with the council temporarily meeting in Chattooga in Alabama in 1831. The following year, the Cherokee Nation permanently moved the seat of their government to Red Clay due to the site's central location and the abundant water source from the Blue Hole Spring, which they considered sacred. By 1836, the site had grown to include 91 log buildings.

A total of eleven general councils were held at Red Clay between 1832 and 1838 under the command of Principal Chief John Ross, each attended by an estimated 4,000 to 5,000 Cherokees. During the meetings, the Cherokees sent delegations to Washington, D.C. to argue to Congress and the President on their behalf, and repeatedly rejected agreements to surrender their lands east of the Mississippi River and move west. While these councils were ongoing, a pro-removal faction known as the Treaty Party arose within the Cherokee Nation, led by Major Ridge, his son John Ridge, Elias Boudinot, and Stand Watie. This faction believed that removal was inevitable and in the best interest of the Cherokee peoples. On December 29, 1835, they secretly signed the Treaty of New Echota at their former capital, without authorization from the national council at Red Clay.

The Treaty of New Echota was considered by many Cherokees to be an act of treason, and was rejected by the council at Red Clay on February 2, 1836. Later that month, two councils convened at Red Clay and Valley Town, North Carolina (now Murphy, North Carolina) and produced two lists totaling some 13,000 names, written in the Sequoyah writing script of the Cherokee language, of Cherokees who were opposed to the treaty. The lists were dispatched to Washington, D.C., and presented by John Ross to Congress. Nevertheless, a slightly modified version of the treaty was ratified by the U.S. Senate by a single vote on May 23, 1836, and signed into law by Andrew Jackson. The treaty provided a grace period until May 1838 for the Cherokees to voluntarily relocate themselves. In an effort to prevent a Cherokee uprising, Brigadier General John E. Wool ordered approximately 300 men to take up position near the Red Clay Council Grounds in mid-1836. The final council at Red Clay took place in August 1837, in which the Cherokees made a final unsuccessful effort to retain their lands. The Cherokee removal officially began on May 26, 1838, and the Cherokee agency at Charleston served as the military operational headquarters for the removal. Many detention camps were located in northern Bradley County between Charleston and Cleveland, with two of the largest at Rattlesnake Springs. The removal became known as the Trail of Tears.

Post-removal
A village known as Red Clay was established south of the park on February 29, 1840, in the present location of Cohutta, Georgia. A large tract of land that includes the site of the park was sold by the state government to Frank Kincannon and John D. Traynor in 1841. Another tract was sold to John B. Marston the following year. The railroad, which had been planned through the area prior to the Cherokee removal, was completed in 1852, and a train depot and section house known as both "Red Clay" and "State Line" was constructed on the site. Most of the council grounds remained farmland. At least three skirmishes took place along the railroad at Red Clay during the American Civil War. On November 27, 1863, two days after the end of the Chattanooga Campaign, Union troops destroyed the depot and tracks at Red Clay in an attempt to prevent the Confederate Army from using the railroad through the area. Beginning in 1864, the site was used by the Army of the Ohio as a staging ground in preparation for the Atlanta Campaign, with additional troops under the command of William Tecumseh Sherman arriving months later. A group of Union scouts engaged in a skirmish nearby on May 3 of that year, and the troops began moving south four days later.

The railroad depot and section house were rebuilt some time after the Civil War, and were later demolished, probably in the 1930s. The land that is now Red Clay State Park was sold and divided multiple times in the roughly 100 years after the Civil War, and continued to be used as farmland. An African American church and cemetery is also speculated to have existed on the site some time after the Civil War. By the 1930s, the exact location of the council grounds had been forgotten, and some speculated that they may have been located in Georgia. This misunderstanding likely resulted from the Red Clay community's location in present-day Cohutta.

State park history and events
In the late 1950s, an effort arose, spearheaded by a number of local historians, to preserve the land of the Red Clay Council Ground, then private land, and turn it into a state park. Local historian James F. Corn purchased 150 acres of the property on June 15, 1964, and five months later, the Cherokee-Red Clay Association was incorporated. In January 1970, Corn reached an agreement with the Bradley County Quarterly Court for them to purchase the land for the purpose of developing it into a tourist attraction. Shortly thereafter, Bill Jenkins, then the Commissioner of the Tennessee Department of Conservation, worked with then-Governor Winfield Dunn to appropriate funds for the establishment of the state park. A series of archaeological excavations of the site took place between 1973 and 1975 and uncovered a small number of artifacts, but failed to determine the location of the council house. The Red Clay Council Grounds were added to the National Register of Historic Places (NRHP) on September 14, 1972, and the state of Tennessee purchased the land for the park in 1974. A dedication for the park took place on May 8, 1976, in a ceremony attended by members of the Eastern Band of Cherokee Indians and local and state leaders. Groundbreaking for the park occurred on April 26, 1978, and Red Clay State Park opened to the public on September 28, 1979. The southeasternmost  were added to the park on July 2, 1980.

The Eternal Flame of the Cherokee Nation, a memorial to the Cherokees who suffered and died during the removal, was placed on the site on April 6, 1984, at an event attended by both the Eastern Band of Cherokee Indians and the Cherokee Nation of Oklahoma. This was the first time the two tribes were reunited since the removal. Between April 17 and 19, 2009, a joint council again convened at Red Clay to commemorate the 25th anniversary of the 1984 event. On August 22 and 23, 2015, the three federally recognized Cherokee tribes; the Eastern Band of Cherokee Indians, Cherokee Nation, and the United Keetoowah Band of Cherokee Indians; reconvened at Red Clay State Park for the first time since the removal. The park has also hosted a number of recurring events. Between 1982 and 2001, an event called the Cherokee Days of Celebration (known as Cherokeefest until 1986) was held at the park in August and sponsored by the state. The festival returned in 2003 as the Cherokee Cultural Celebration. The event, sponsored by the Eastern Band of Cherokee Indians and other groups, features exhibitions about Cherokee culture and heritage. Friends of Red Clay was established as a nonprofit organization in 2007, and hosted an annual pow wow in October, the last of which occurred in 2019.

Description

It is located in the Ridge and Valley physiographic province of the Appalachian Mountains. It is accessible via Red Clay Park Road, which traverses the park; the main entrance is on the north end, and a secondary entrance is located at the southeast boundary on the state line. A Norfolk Southern Railway mainline runs along the eastern fringes of the park.

A replica of a Cherokee farmstead, sleeping huts, and the council house where the council meetings took place prior to the removal are found on the location of the council grounds. Originals of all of these structures once stood on the site; however, the number of sleeping huts and other log structures was much greater. More recent historical investigations also suggest that the actual council house may have been much larger, with a smoke vent in the roof for the council fire. The park contains the iconic Blue Hole Spring, also known as the Council Spring, which was considered sacred to the Cherokees. The spring rises out of a bowl-like depression and takes its name from its deep blue color. Also located on the site is the Eternal Flame of the Cherokee Nation, which serves as a memorial to the Cherokees who suffered and died during the removal, and is permanently kept lit.

The James F. Corn Interpretive Center inside the park is a museum that features exhibits about 18th and 19th century Cherokee culture, government and politics, economy, recreation, religion and spiritual beliefs, and history. A series of stained glass windows depicts the forced removal of the Cherokee and subsequent Trail of Tears emigration. There is also a short film about the history of the site. An unmarked grave believed to belong to Sleeping Rabbit, a prominent Cherokee who fought in the War of 1812, is reportedly located in the eastern part of the park.

The last of these ascends the ridge on the eastern half of the park and has a stone overlook tower. Also within the park are a pavilion, picnic areas, an amphitheater which can seat about 500 people, and a mini-theater. The pavilion must be reserved.

See also
New Echota
Fort Cass
Hiwassee River Heritage Center
Cherokee Removal Memorial Park

References

Bibliography

Citations

External links

 Official website
 Friends of Red Clay

Protected areas of Bradley County, Tennessee
State parks of Tennessee
Museums in Bradley County, Tennessee
Native American museums in Tennessee
History of the Cherokee
Cherokee Nation (1794–1907)
Trail of Tears
National Register of Historic Places in Tennessee
National Register of Historic Places in Bradley County, Tennessee
1979 establishments in Tennessee